The Terengganu River is a river in Terengganu, Malaysia. Originated from Lake Kenyir, it flows through the state capital of Terengganu, Kuala Terengganu, and flows into the South China Sea. It is bridged by the Sultan Mahmud Bridge, Manir Bridge, Pulau Sekati Bridge and also the latest, Kuala Terengganu Drawbridge in Kuala Terengganu.

See also
 List of rivers of Malaysia

References

Rivers of Terengganu
Rivers of Malaysia